Unplugged at the Lowlands Festival '97 is a live album released by Life of Agony in 2000 through Roadrunner Records.

The first 8 tracks were recorded live at the Lowlands Festival in Holland on August 23, 1997.  Tracks 9 to 15 are bonus tracks: track 9 is a previously unreleased studio track, track 10 was recorded live on August 24, 1997 in Cologne, Germany, and tracks 11 to 15 were recorded live on February 25, 1994 in Asbury Park, NJ.

Track listing

Personnel
Life of Agony
Mina Caputo – lead vocals
Joey Z. – guitar, backing vocals
Alan Robert – bass, backing vocals
Dan Richardson – drums (tracks 1 to 8, 10)
Sal Abruscato – drums (tracks 9, 11 to 15)

References

Life of Agony albums
2000 live albums
Roadrunner Records live albums